Mitchell Township is a township in Mitchell County, Iowa, USA.

History
Mitchell Township was established in 1855.

References

Townships in Mitchell County, Iowa
Townships in Iowa